The Telugu Filmfare Best Music Director Award is given by the Filmfare magazine as part of its annual Filmfare Awards for Telugu films. Here is a list of the award winners and the films for which they won.

Superlatives

Winners

See also 
 Filmfare Awards (Telugu)
 Cinema of Andhra Pradesh

References

Filmfare Awards South
Film awards for Best Music Director
Indian music awards